The Nabatieh Fawka attack occurred on 16 April 1996, when Israeli warplanes bombed an apartment in the village of Nabatieh Fawka, killing nine people, seven of whom were children.

Context 
On September 19, 1994, the village came under attack and was hit with Israeli flechette-filled shells that killed 4 civilians, and wounded another four.

The attack was one of several incidents in  mid April 1996 which occurred shortly after Israel announced the execution of Operation Grapes of Wrath on the 11th of that month. In these instances, Israeli helicopter missiles killed Lebanese civilians. On the 13th, an Israeli Apache helicopter, after hovering for several minutes over the Shiite village of Mansouri 8 kilometres from the Israeli border, fired a missile at an ambulance as it was passing  a UN checkpoint. The vehicle was carrying 13 people, aware of Israeli requests that villages in the south evacuate their residents, who were fleeing. 4 children and two women were incinerated. It later stated that the village ambulance, either was a vehicle owned by a member of Hezbollah or was hiding one of its guerillas, a claim denied by Robert Fisk who interviewed eyewitnesses on the site soon afterwards. Hezbollah retaliated the following day by firing 81 Katyusha rockets into Israel, 28%  of the total it launched during the Israeli operation.

On the 18th of April, Israeli artillery opened fire on the Shiite and Catholic Melkite village of Qana, killing 106 people in what became known as the Qana massacre. In other incidents that week, an Israeli helicopter pilot fired a missile at a car near the Jieh power station driven by a young woman who had just stopped to buy a sandwich. In West Beirut a  two-year-old girl was decapitated by another missile.

Attack 
The village of Nabatieh Fawka, 20 miles north of Qana, is located on a stretch of hills 3 km north of the Nabatieh city. The Al Abed had family moved there since it seemed a relatively safer location, out of the way of the IDF and the South Lebanon Army. The father, Hassan, was absent at the time, since he had departed to perform the Hajj in Mecca.

Around 5 AM, IDF helicopters were flying over the area. At 6:30, they fired rockets at the two-story house where the family was sleeping, completely demolishing it. They also hit two other buildings, causing severe damage. Initial reports from the Lebanese Army stated that 11 civilians had been killed, including a four-day-old infant.

Victims 

Two others, Nujud, 18, and Ibrahim, 15 were rescued and survived.

Aftermath 
Shortly after the attack, the IDF released a statement claiming that it was a "response to a Hezbollah attack in the security zone". Investigations by Amnesty International and Human Rights Watch found no evidence that Hezbollah was hiding in the building.

Israeli Prime Minister Shimon Peres blamed the civilians for staying in Nabatieh, saying that they should have left earlier.

The ID attack on the UNIFIL compound in Qana, leaving 106 civilians dead, took place later on the same day.

Operation Grapes of Wrath concluded shortly after this last attack. In 16 days, Israel carried out 600 air strikes and fired some 25,000 shells into Southern Lebanon, resulting in the death of 154 civilians and a further 351 injured.

The incident has been cited in a recent study of media bias in reporting conflicts in the Middle East.

Notes

Citations

Sources

 
   · 

 

1996 murders in Lebanon
1996 in Lebanon
April 1996 events in Asia
Massacres committed by Israel
Massacres in 1996
Massacres of Muslims
Massacres of the Lebanese Civil War
Nabatieh District
Operation Grapes of Wrath
South Lebanon conflict (1985–2000)
Violence against Muslims
War crimes in Lebanon